Dorcan is an area in the east of Swindon, Wiltshire, England, located close to the A419.

The population of Dorcan electoral ward taken at the 2011 census was 8,684.

Taking its name from the nearby Dorkerne (now Dorcan) brook, Dorcan is within the civil parish of Nythe, Eldene and Liden, and is bounded to the north by Covingham parish.  It is the site of the Dorcan Industrial Estate which includes the UK headquarters of Tyco Electronics and offices of Npower (UK), Equiinet, MMG MagDev, Romec, House of Fraser (information systems) and a Royal Mail sorting office. The pharmaceutical company Patheon also has a large facility here.

The Dorcan Academy, a secondary school, is also in this area.

References

Swindon